Dương Hồng Sơn (born November 20, 1982) is a Vietnamese football manager and former player who is the manager of Quang Nam.
He is best known for his performance helping the Vietnam national team to win their first ASEAN Championship. He was declared 2008 AFF Suzuki Cup MVP of the tournament.

Early life 

Hong Son was born in a working family in Quỳnh Lưu, Nghe An. Like many players, Hong Son was passionate about football since he was young. In 1995, he joined Quynh Luu's youth team with the youth team Sông Lam Nghệ An, led by coach Nguyen Van Huy.

Career

Song Lam Nghe An 
Duong began playing for Song Lam Nghe An. One year later he joined the SLN U14 National Championship. Two years later, along with Phan Thanh Hoan, Chu Ngoc Canh, Nguyen Cong Manh Duong, he won the U16 National Championship.

Son was selected to the national U16 team. The coaches were Nguyen Hong Thanh and Nguyen, both belonged to the Song Lam Nghe An.

Nguyen told him, "Little goalkeepers, if hard training, confident and Have the talent to become good goalkeepers." He again moved Duong to the position of goalkeeper.

In 2002, he was brought to the Hanoi Football Club. After a competitive season, he helped the club qualify.

T & T Hanoi 
In 2007, his Song Lam Nghe An contract expired, and he joined the Hà Nội T&T. The club reached the V-League.

National team 
Duong was coached by Alfred Riedl for the Asia Cup in 2007. He played well in the subsequent UAE National Football Team competition against the Qatar National Team, In the quarterfinals, they lost to the Iraqi National Team, who then won the championship.

Duong was voted the best player in the 2008 AFF Suzuki Cup. He made several saves for the Vietnam national football team, especially against the Singapore national football team in the return leg and the next match.

Throughout his career, he was regarded to be the most prominent goalkeeper of Vietnamese national team since rejoining global football at the 1990s.

Coach 
He became a goalkeeping coach and ended his playing career. He later became the goalkeeper for U-19 team of T&T Hanoi Football Club. In 2020 he becomes the head coach for newly formed Phú Thọ Football Club.

Honours
Vietnam
 AFF Championship: 2008

Individual
 AFF Championship MVP: 2008
 Vietnamese Golden Ball: 2008

References

External links
VFF squad profile

1982 births
Living people
Vietnamese footballers
Association football goalkeepers
Vietnam international footballers
2007 AFC Asian Cup players
People from Nghệ An province
Song Lam Nghe An FC players
Hanoi FC players
V.League 1 players